Kozi rog is a village in Gabrovo Municipality, in Gabrovo Province, in northern central Bulgaria.

References

Villages in Gabrovo Province